Marisa Cleveland is an American author and educator, an executive director for The Seymour Agency, and a managing partner for Simeris Alliance. Her debut teen novel, Accidental Butterfly, hit the New York Times and USA Today bestsellers list as part of an anthology in June 2015.

Cleveland was born in South Korea, adopted and raised in New Hampshire, attended George Mason University for her bachelor's and master's degrees, and earned her Doctor of Education (Ed.D.) from Northeastern University. She also holds a master's of arts in English from National University. She is a 2015 FACE award recipient for Arts and Culture, and a 2014 Forty under 40 honoree. She has served on the boards of the Naples Press Club  and Southwest Florida Romance Writers, and is a Hodges University Board of Trustees member.

Books
Nonfiction
There Is No Box, 2022
Erase the Line, 2016
The People's Commissioner, 2017

Middle Grade
Inheritance, 2016

Teen
Accidental Butterfly, 2015

Contemporary Romance
The Valentine Challenge, 2013
Reforming the Cowboy, 2013
Blurring the Lines, 2015
Reforming the CEO, 2019

Paranormal Fiction
Pushed, 2014

Articles
 "Toward Leadership Agility", Global Issues and Innovative Solutions in Healthcare, Culture, and the Environment, May 2020
 "Leadership Competencies for Sustained Project Success", International Journal of Applied Management Theory and Research, December 2019
 "Culturally Agile Leadership: A Relational Leadership Development Approach", International Journal of Public and Private Perspectives on Healthcare, Culture, and the Environment, November 2019
 "Toward Understanding How Cultural Agility Leads to Civil Discourse", 2019 AGLSP Annual Conference, October 2019
 "Building Engaged Communities -- A Collaborative Leadership Approach", Smart Cities, November 2018
 "Toward a Model for Ethical Cybersecurity Leadership", International Journal of Smart Education and Urban Society, October 2018
 "Toward Cybersecurity Leadership Framework", 13th Midwest Association for Information Systems Conference, May 2018
 "Cybercrime Post-incident Leadership Model", 13th Midwest Association for Information Systems Conference, May 2018 
 "Toward Understanding the Impact of Entrepreneurial Leadership Skills on Community Engagement", 6th International Conference on Innovation and Entrepreneurship, March 2018
 "Little Fires Everywhere Book Remarks", Coastal Breeze, January 2018
 "A Study of Human Nature: Atlas Shrugged", Coastal Breeze, February 2017
 "The Last Time We Say Goodbye Book Remarks", Coastal Breeze, August 2017
 "Talk About Tournaments", Coastal Breeze, May 2016
 "Bayshore Cultural and Performing Arts Center to Build Their Vision", Spotlight Magazine, November 2014
 "Gene Doyle Backcountry Catch and Release Fishing Tournament", Spotlight Magazine, April 2014

Press
Give the Gift of Leadership Coastal Breeze News, December 2022
Fiala now a bookish commissioner Naples Daily News, May 2017
Passing the Gavel, Naples Daily News, January 2016
Marco Island Writers Meet, Coastal Breeze News, January 2016
Leadership Marco A Good Kind of Summer School, Coastal Breeze News, August 2015
Leadership Marco Profiles, Marco Island Sun Times, August 2015
Naples Press Club Elects 2015 Board, Coastal Breeze News, February 2015
Face Awards, Gulfshore Business Magazine, February 2015
Arts and Culture: Marisa Cleveland, Face Awards 2015, February 2015
FACE Awards, D'Latinos Magazine, pgs. 35-39, February 2015
D'Latinos y Face Awards premian la diversidad en SWFL, Naples Daily News, February 2015
5ta Gala Anual Face Awards D'Latinos, Naples Daily News, February 2015
Naples Press Club announces officers, Naples Daily News, January 2015
Rising Leaders: Let's Do This, Gulfshore Life Magazine, November 2014
Forty under 40, Gulfshore Business, September 2014
SWFRW Conference, Publishers Weekly, February 2014
Hot Tuesday New Releases, Publishers Weekly, January 2014
Seymour Agency Retreat, Publishers Weekly, January 2014
Looking for Romance, Spotlight Magazine, January 2014

References

21st-century American writers
American young adult novelists
American romantic fiction novelists
George Mason University alumni
Living people
Year of birth missing (living people)
South Korean emigrants to the United States